William Orton (June 14, 1826 – April 22, 1878) was an American businessman who served as president of the Western Union Telegraph Company.

Early life
William Orton was born in Cuba, New York on June 14, 1826.  He was trained as a printer and worked on a newspaper in the village of Cuba.  He graduated from the State Normal School (now the State University of New York at Albany) in 1847, and received his certification as a teacher.

He taught at a school in Cuba, and then moved to Geneva to become a clerk in a bookstore.  In 1852 Orton moved to Buffalo, where he became a partner in a publishing company called Derby, Orton & Co.

Start of career
In 1858 Orton moved to New York City to become a partner in another publishing company, Miller & Orton.  This firm went out of business two years later, with Orton moving to the bookselling and publishing firm of J. G. Gregory & Co. as managing clerk.

A Republican and supporter of the Union during the American Civil War, Orton was elected to New York City's Common Council in 1860, and served one term.

From 1862 to 1865 he was federal Collector of Revenue for the 6th district of New York.  In 1865 Orton was appointed Commissioner of Internal Revenue, but he served at this post in Washington, D.C. for only four months before resigning to resume his business career.

Continued career

Orton was appointed president of the United States Telegraph Company in the fall of 1865.  When this company merged with Western Union in 1866 Orton was appointed Western Union's vice president.  He also studied law, and attained admission to the bar in 1867.  In 1867 Jeptha Wade resigned as president of Western Union, and Orton succeeded him.  In addition to his position at Western Union, Orton was president of the Gold and Stock Telegraph Company, International Ocean Telegraph Company, and Atlantic and Southern Telegraph Company.

In 1871 President Ulysses S. Grant offered the position of Collector of the Port of New York to John Augustus Griswold, who declined.  Grant then offered to nominate Orton, who also declined.  Griswold and Orton both recommended Chester A. Arthur, who received the appointment.

Orton was a delegate to the 1872 and 1876 Republican National Conventions.

He was active in the Episcopal Church, and served as a vestryman at New York City's Church of the Holy Apostles.

Death
Orton died at his home in New York City on April 22, 1878.  He was buried at Sleepy Hollow Cemetery in Sleepy Hollow, New York.  He was succeeded by Norvin Green as the head of Western Union.

Family
In 1852 Orton married Agnes J. Gillespie of Buffalo.  They were the parents of eight children: Jessie; Alice; William, Jr.; James; Agnes; M. Virginia; Robert; and Grosvenor.

References

External links
William Orton in The Telegraph in America: Its Founders, Promoters, and Noted Men.  James D. Reid (1879).

1826 births
1878 deaths
Politicians from Geneva, New York
University at Albany, SUNY alumni
Commissioners of Internal Revenue
American telecommunications industry businesspeople
Western Union people
New York (state) lawyers
New York (state) Republicans
New York City Council members
Burials at Sleepy Hollow Cemetery
19th-century American politicians
American lawyers admitted to the practice of law by reading law
19th-century American lawyers
19th-century American businesspeople